Nights with Alice Cooper is a radio show hosted by Detroit born rock and roll artist and shock rock pioneer Alice Cooper. It is syndicated by United Stations Radio Networks and broadcast on a wide variety of affiliate radio stations in the United States, Canada,  the United Kingdom, Australia, New Zealand, and Europe.  The most recent show is also streamed online in a continuous loop by Radionomy; this stream is also used for the official Nights with Alice Cooper app for iOS and Android, which additionally offers "exclusive content" as well as interaction with other fans.

During the program Cooper plays requests as well as his favorite songs (most of which are from the classic rock genre), answers emails from his fans, and interviews celebrities. Celebrities he has interviewed on his show include Joe Perry of Aerosmith, Brian Johnson of AC/DC, Ozzy Osbourne, Meat Loaf, Rob Zombie, Glenn Danzig, Def Leppard, Peter Frampton and Jerry Springer. The show also plays rare tracks from classic rock artists, along with blues, early punk rock, and psychedelic music.

In 2005, The Guardian described the program as "a distinctive music show... Cooper makes an entertaining host with some unique one-liners".

History 
The show debuted on January 26, 2004, on 16 stations, including its flagship station, KDKB in Phoenix, Arizona (later moved to sister station KSLX-FM following its switch to alternative rock).

Nights with Alice Cooper features many segments, including "Tuesday Bluesday", "Freaky Facts", "Movie Music Madness", "Cooper's Covers", "Same Name" (two different songs with the same name), "Closet Classic", "The Quiet Room", "Lockdown Rockdown" (songs for Cooper's jailed listeners), "Monster Prog", "Throwback Thursday", "Hey Superstar Clean Out the Garage", "The Best Band You've Never Heard In Your Life" and "Songs We Just Don't Understand". Alice also plays his own rare songs and tells the stories behind them in the "Alice's B.O." (Beyond Obscure) and "Alice's Lost Hits" segments.

Holidays are big events on Nights with Alice Cooper, especially Halloween. The radio show has offered numerous contests and giveaways, including a flyaway trip to see Cooper in concert; a trip to see Led Zeppelin in London; and in October 2008, the giveaway of a signed ESP guitar. Alice is also a huge trivia buff, and gives away signed pairs of his own pants to listeners who correctly answer his questions, which mostly relate to rare rock or movie trivia.

The show is also known for Cooper's humorous self-deprecating one-liner outros to commercial breaks: An announcer often tells Cooper's listeners that they are listening to (among many things) "a man for whom even Dr. Phil has no cure", "a man who is not afraid to look like a fool--and demonstrates so regularly", and, possibly most famously, "a man with a face made for radio", and other things mocking and/or questioning Cooper's intelligence, wisdom, talent, career, activities, looks, etc. in such ways.

In the early days of the show, the program featured several scripted comedy skits which centered around Alice and his life and were written by Kristine "Kiki" Valentine Rakowsky who played Alice's counterpart Mistress Kitty on the show. Many of these featured Alice getting into arguments with rock musicians who asked Cooper for money he allegedly owed them for shows. These arguments would ultimately result in Cooper getting beaten senseless by the artists, who would often yell "and THIS is for making fun of RUSH!" (which was a common joke of Cooper's at the time.)

Nights with Alice Cooper is produced by music journalist and former Rockline producer Katherine Turman.

Affiliates

United States
 KBFX-FM 100.5 FM Anchorage, Alaska
 KROR 101.5 FM Hastings, Nebraska
 KLPX96.1 FM Tucson, Arizona
 WRSW-FM 107.3 FM Warsaw, Indiana
 WRKW 99.1 FM Ebensburg, Pennsylvania
 KKLN 94.1 FM Willmar, Minnesota
 KSLX 100.7 FM Phoenix, Arizona
 WDVT 94.5 FM Rutland, Vermont
 WLKZ 104.9 FM Wolfeboro, New Hampshire
 WCHX 105.5 FM Lewistown, Pennsylvania
 WQFX-FM 103.1 FM Jamestown, New York ,        Russell, Pennsylvania
 WYCR 98.5 FM Harrisburg & Lancaster, Pennsylvania
 KASR 99.3/105.5, Atkins, Arkansas
 KZLE 93.3 FM Batesville, Arkansas
 KLKK103.7 FM Mason City, Iowa
 KVRV 97.7 FMMonte Rio, California
 WZUU 92.5 FM Kalamazoo, Michigan
 WRKY-FM 104.9 FM Hollidaysburg, Pennsylvania
 WMPA 93.1 FM Ferrysburg, Michigan
 WJJH 96.7 FM Ashland, Wisconsin
 KIOO 99.7 FM Porterville, California
 KHEI 107.5 FM Kihei, Hawaii
 KKZX 98.9 FM Spokane, Washington
 KRVX 103.1 FM Wimbledon, North Dakota
 WIMZ 103.5 FM Knoxville, Tennessee
 WILZ 104.5 FM Saginaw, Michigan
 KCMQ 96.7 FM Columbia, Missouri
 WWUZ 96.9 Bowling Green, Virginia (Fredericksburg, Virginia)
 WKIT 100.3 FM Bangor, Maine
 KIXA-FM 106.5 FM Lucerne Valley, California
 WGRF 96.9 FM Buffalo, New York
 KGGO 94.9 FM Des Moines, Iowa
 KYSC 96.9 FM Fairbanks, Alaska
 WKKN 101.9 FM Westminster, Vermont
 WTHK 100.7 FMWilmington, Vermont
 KSPQ 93.9 FM West Plains, Missouri
 KKZU 101.7 FM Elk City, Oklahoma
WQRI 94.3 FM (and WRQW, Simulcast Station) — Saegertown, Pennsylvania (simulcast station licensed to Cooperstown, Pennsylvania)
KOZZ  105.7 FM Reno, Nevada
WCSX 94.7 FM Detroit, Michigan

Canada
 CFMK-FM 96.3FM Kingston, Ontario
 CFRQ-FM 104.3FM Halifax, Nova Scotia
 CIXL-FM 91.7FM Welland, Ontario
 CKLY-FM 91.9FM Lindsay, Ontario
 CKLZ-FM 104.7FM Kelowna, British Columbia
 CHOM-FM 97.7FM Montréal, Quebec
 CFMI-FM 101.1 Vancouver, British Columbia

United Kingdom
 Planet Rock DAB / Sky / Freesat / Virgin Media nationally

Australia
 Triple M Classic Rock
 104.1 Territory FM Darwin, Northern Territory
 Crow FM 90.7FM Wondai, Queensland
 Rebel FM (various) Remote New South Wales and Queensland

Denmark
 MyROCK Nationwide on FM bands

Germany
 Radio BOB Nationwide DAB+ and in some regions FM

New Zealand
 The Sound (New Zealand) (various) Nationwide on FM bands

References

External links 
 Official Nights with Alice Cooper website

American music radio programs
Alice Cooper